Across the Dead-Line is a lost 1922 American silent northwoods drama film directed by Jack Conway and starring Frank Mayo.

Plot
As described in a film magazine, after Enoch Kidder (Simpson) discovers his son John (Mayo) in his brother Aaron's (Lucas) saloon, he lays a line down the center of the main street of the rough mining town and separating the brothers' houses, and tells Aaron that he will kill him if he ever steps across it. John later finds a young woman in the wood wearing a wedding gown who does not remember how she got there or her name, and John befriends her against his father's wishes. Aaron wants to discredit John's honesty and attempts to blackmail him and kidnap the woman, now known as Ruth (Malone). Aaron obtains a warrant to arrest the woman by a man posing as her husband. Warned of Aaron's plan, John takes Ruth to a lodge high in the mountains. Abel (Swickard), an old man with a grievance against Aaron, follows him. Enoch also goes, determined to find his son. When Aaron attempts to arrest John, a fight breaks out between them. When Aaron is killed, the mystery of who shot him is cleared up when Abel confesses. Ruth's memory is restored, and there is a happy ending when her bogus husband is exposed.

Cast
Frank Mayo as John Kidder
Russell Simpson as Enoch Kidder
Wilfred Lucas as Aaron Kidder
Lydia Knott as Charity Kidder
Molly Malone as Ruth
Frank Thorwald as Lucas Courtney
Josef Swickard as Abel
William Marion as Gillis
George Williamson as Judge White
Whitehorse as Buck Ballard
Alfred Hewston as Station agent

References

External links

Lantern slide (Wayback archived)

1922 films
American silent feature films
Films directed by Jack Conway
Universal Pictures films
Lost American films
Silent American drama films
1922 drama films
1922 lost films
Lost drama films
1920s English-language films
1920s American films